Thomas Albert Dwight "Tad" Jones (February 22, 1887 – June 19, 1957) was an American football player and coach in the United States.  He served as the head football coach at Syracuse University (1909–1910) and Yale University (1916–1917, 1920–1927), compiling a career college football record of 69–24–6.  He was inducted into the College Football Hall of Fame as a coach in 1958.

Jones quarterbacked Yale to 6–0 and 12–0 victories versus Harvard as a junior and senior, respectively, in 1906 and 1907. Yale finished with 9–0–1 records both years, and he was named an All-American both seasons.  As head coach, Jones led Yale football to a 5–3–1 record versus Harvard, and gave the most revered pregame pep talk in Yale athletic history before the Harvard–Yale game in 1923.  Before that contest Jones intoned famously, "Gentlemen, you are about to play football against Harvard. Never again may you do something so important." Yale won 13-0, with Babe Ruth providing broadcast commentary. Ducky Pond returned a Harvard fumble sixty-three yards for a touchdown. Bill Mallory kicked the extra point and two field goals. The Yale team was 8-0 for the season.

Family and honors
Jones's older brother was Howard Jones, who also played at Yale from 1905 to 1907.  The elder Jones also coached at Yale and Syracuse, as well as Ohio State University, the University of Iowa, Duke University, and the University of Southern California.

The "T.A.D. Jones" room at the gymnasium of Phillips Exeter Academy, where he taught, is named for Jones.

Thomas Albert Dwight "Tad" Jones is entombed in a private crypt in Woodside Cemetery & Arboretum in Middletown, OH

Head coaching record

College

Notes

References

External links
 

1887 births
1957 deaths
All-American college football players
Yale Bulldogs baseball players
Yale Bulldogs football players
Yale Bulldogs football coaches
Syracuse Orange football coaches
Phillips Exeter Academy faculty
College Football Hall of Fame inductees
Phillips Exeter Academy alumni
People from Butler County, Ohio
Coaches of American football from Ohio
Players of American football from Ohio